René Pavard (born 3 October 1934) is a French former professional racing cyclist. He rode in the 1959 and 1960 Tour de France.

References

External links
 

1934 births
Living people
French male cyclists
Cyclists from Paris